Maury is a commune in the Pyrénées-Orientales department in southern France.

Geography 
Maury is located in the canton of La Vallée de l'Agly and in the arrondissement of Perpignan.

Population

See also
Maury AOC
Communes of the Pyrénées-Orientales department

References

Communes of Pyrénées-Orientales
Fenouillèdes